The 1984 San Francisco 49ers season was their 39th season in the National Football League (NFL). The season was highlighted by their second Super Bowl victory. The franchise had their best season ever with a record of 15 wins and only 1 loss. Quarterback Joe Montana would be awarded the Super Bowl's Most Valuable Player Award for the second time in his career, joining Bart Starr and Terry Bradshaw as the only two-time Super Bowl MVPs.

The 1984 49ers became the first team to win fifteen games in the NFL's regular season since the league went to a sixteen-game schedule in 1978. The 49ers, if not for their loss to the Steelers, would have become the 2nd team after the 1972 Miami Dolphins to complete a perfect season, and the Niners would have been the first to do so since the NFL expanded to a 16-game schedule. The 1985 Chicago Bears, the 1998 Minnesota Vikings, the 2004 Pittsburgh Steelers, the 2011 Green Bay Packers, and the 2015 Carolina Panthers would later join the 1984 49ers to finish 15–1, although the 2007 New England Patriots would exceed this feat by finishing the regular season at an unbeaten 16–0. However, the only other one of these teams that won the Super Bowl was the 1985 Bears.

In the playoffs, the 49ers were the #1 seed. They defeated the Giants 21–10 in the divisional round, then they shut out the Chicago Bears 23–0 in the NFC Championship, and finally defeated the Miami Dolphins 38–16 in Super Bowl XIX. This 49ers team has gone down as the best in franchise history and many call this season the best in Joe Montana's career.

NFL Films produced a documentary about the team's season entitled A Team Above All; it was narrated by Brad Crandall. On January 29, 2007, NFL Network aired America's Game: The Super Bowl Champions, in which they ranked the 1984 49ers at #8; the film was narrated by Gene Hackman and featured commentary from players Russ Francis, Keena Turner and Dwight Hicks. More than a decade later, the team gained greater esteem by ranking #4 on the 100 greatest teams of all time presented by the NFL on its 100th anniversary.

Offseason

NFL Draft

NFL Supplemental Draft

Training Camp
The 1984 San Francisco 49ers held training camp at Sierra College in Rocklin, California.

Personnel

Staff

Roster

Pre season

Schedule

Regular season
The 49ers advanced to their second Super Bowl in team history after becoming the first team ever to win 15 regular season games since the league expanded to a 16-game schedule in 1978. Much of the hype surrounding the team was their offense, which boasted 5 Pro Bowlers. Quarterback Joe Montana recorded 279 out of 432 completions for 3,630 yards, 28 touchdowns, and only 10 interceptions. Running back Roger Craig was one of the 49ers' major weapons, both rushing and receiving. Craig was the team's second leading rusher with 649 rushing yards and 7 touchdowns, and also caught 71 passes for 675 yards. Pro Bowl running back Wendell Tyler, who had rushed for a team record 1,262 yards during the regular season, recorded 7 rushing touchdowns, and also caught 28 passes for 230 yards and 2 touchdown receptions. Wide receivers Freddie Solomon and Dwight Clark also were deep threats, gaining a combined total of 1,617 yards and 16 touchdowns. Up front, 3 of the 49ers' 5 starting offensive linemen, Randy Cross, Fred Quillan, and Keith Fahnhorst, had been selected to play in the Pro Bowl. Overall, San Francisco's offense finished the season ranked second in the NFL in scoring (475 points) and fourth in total yards (6,544).

Although they did not get as much media attention as the offense, the 49ers defense led the league in fewest points allowed during the regular season (227). All 4 of the 49ers' starting defensive backs, Ronnie Lott, Eric Wright, Carlton Williamson, and Dwight Hicks, were selected to play in the Pro Bowl. Pro Bowl linebacker Keena Turner was also a major defensive weapon, recording 2 sacks and 4 interceptions for 51 yards. Defensive end Dwaine Board anchored the line, recording 10 sacks and 1 fumble recovery.

Schedule

Game summaries

Week 1 (Sunday, September 2, 1984): at Detroit Lions 

Point spread: 49ers by 2½
 Over/Under: 43.0 (over)
 Time of Game:

Week 2 (Monday, September 10, 1984): vs. Washington Redskins 

Point spread: 49ers by 2
 Over/Under: 52.0 (over)
 Time of Game:

Week 3 (Sunday, September 16, 1984): vs. New Orleans Saints 

Point spread: 49ers by 5½
 Over/Under: 45.0 (over)
 Time of Game:

Week 4 (Sunday, September 23, 1984): at Philadelphia Eagles 

Point spread: 49ers by 4½
 Over/Under: 44.0 (under)
 Time of Game:

Week 5 (Sunday, September 30, 1984): vs. Atlanta Falcons 

Point spread: 49ers by 6
 Over/Under: 49.5 (under)
 Time of Game:

Week 6 (Monday, October 8, 1984): at New York Giants 

Point spread: 49ers by 3
 Over/Under: 44.0 (under)
 Time of Game:

Week 7 (Sunday, October 14, 1984): vs. Pittsburgh Steelers 

Point spread: 49ers by 8
 Over/Under: 42.0 (under)
 Time of Game: 

The 49ers' hope for a perfect season was foiled by the Steelers when Gary Anderson kicked the game-winning field goal in the fourth quarter that would ultimately prevent the 49ers from going undefeated.

Week 8 (Sunday, October 21, 1984): at Houston Oilers

Point spread: 49ers by 11
 Over/Under: 42.0 (over)
 Time of Game:

Week 9 (Sunday, October 28, 1984): at Los Angeles Rams 

Point spread: 49ers by 3
 Over/Under: 45.0 (under)
 Time of Game:

Week 10 (Sunday, November 4, 1984): vs. Cincinnati Bengals 

Point spread: 49ers by 10½
 Over/Under: 43.0 (under)
 Time of Game:

Week 11 (Sunday, November 11, 1984): at Cleveland Browns 

Point spread: 49ers by 6
 Over/Under: 35.0 (over)
 Time of Game:

Week 12 (Sunday, November 18, 1984): vs. Tampa Bay Buccaneers 

Point spread: 49ers by 12
 Over/Under: 40.0 (over)
 Time of Game: 2 hours, 52 minutes

Week 13 (Sunday, November 25, 1984): at New Orleans Saints 

Point spread: 49ers by 2
 Over/Under: 42.0 (under)
 Time of Game:

Week 14 (Sunday, December 2, 1984): at Atlanta Falcons 

Point spread: 49ers by 13
 Over/Under: 40.0 (over)
 Time of Game:

Week 15 (Saturday, December 8, 1984): vs. Minnesota Vikings 

Point spread: 49ers by 17
 Over/Under: 44.0 (over)
 Time of Game:

Week 16 (Friday, December 14, 1984): vs. Los Angeles Rams 

Point spread: 49ers by 6
 Over/Under: 44.0 (under)
 Time of Game:

Game officials

Preseason

Regular season

Standings

Final statistics

Statistical comparison

Quarter-by-quarter

Individual leaders

1Completions/attempts
2Carries
3Long gain
4Receptions
5Interceptions
6Sacks
7Punts
8Kickoff Returns
9Punt Returns

Playoffs

NFC Divisional Playoff (Saturday, December 29, 1984): vs. New York Giants 
Quarterback Joe Montana threw for 309 yards and 3 touchdown passes as he led the 49ers to a victory, while receiver Dwight Clark caught 9 passes for 112 yards and a touchdown.

Point spread: 49ers by 12
 Over/Under: 41.0 (under)
 Time of Game:

NFC Championship Game (Sunday, January 6, 1985): vs. Chicago Bears 
The 49ers passed for 228 yards while limiting the Bears to only 37 passing yards and no points.

Point spread: 49ers by 10
 Over/Under: 40.0 (under)
 Time of Game:

Super Bowl XIX (Sunday, January 20, 1985): vs. Miami Dolphins 

Point spread: 49ers by 3
 Over/Under: 53.5 (over)
 Time of Game: 3 hours, 13 minutes

Game officials

Awards and records
 Joe Montana, Super Bowl Most Valuable Player
 Joe Montana, All-Pro Selection
 Joe Montana, NFC Pro Bowl Selection

1985 AFC–NFC Pro Bowl

Media

Pre season Local TV

Local Radio

References

External links
 1984 49ers on Pro Football Reference
 49ers Schedule on jt-sw.com

San Francisco 49ers seasons
San Francisco
NFC West championship seasons
National Football Conference championship seasons
Super Bowl champion seasons
1984 in San Francisco
San